Tom Hewitt (born c. 1957) is an American actor and Broadway stage performer, and a native of Victor, Montana.

Early life and career
After graduating from the University of Wisconsin–Milwaukee with the Professional Theatre Training Program's first class in 1981, Tom Hewitt worked with such regional powerhouses as Minneapolis's Guthrie Theatre, the Arena Stage in Washington, D.C., and the Berkshire Theatre Festival in New England before heading to New York and the commercial stage.

Later career
While in the first part of his career he appeared primarily in straight plays, such as Beau Jest and Jeffrey, once in New York he became better known for his performances in musicals.
On Broadway, Hewitt has appeared in The Lion King, Art, The School for Scandal, The Sisters Rosensweig, The Boys from Syracuse, Jesus Christ Superstar, Amazing Grace, and Hadestown. He was nominated for a Tony Award for his portrayal of Frank-N-Furter in the 2000 revival of The Rocky Horror Show.

Hewitt's Off-Broadway credits include acting in a New York Shakespeare Festival production of Othello.
Tom Hewitt's first above-title credit came when he played the title role of Dracula in Frank Wildhorn's Dracula, The Musical on Broadway from August 19, 2004 – January 2, 2005.
In 2006–2007, he headlined in the national touring Broadway production of the musical Dirty Rotten Scoundrels. He received a 2007 Touring Broadway Award.
In November 2009, he began his two month run in Peter Pan as Captain Hook/Mr. Darling at the Mansion Theater in Branson, Missouri alongside Cathy Rigby in the lead role. He reprised this role in the national tour, which began performances August 2011. In February 2010, he was in the National Tour of Chicago. In October 2013, he performed in New York City in a one-person show called Another Medea.
For a limited time, starting in September 2021, Hewitt played Hades in the reopening of the Broadway production of Hadestown after the COVID-19 pandemic, serving as a temporary replacement for Patrick Page. After two stints in the Broadway revival of Chicago as Billy Flynn, Hewitt returned to Hadestown in June, 2022, again serving as a temporary replacement for Page. Following Page's retirement from the show in December, 2022, Hewitt was announced as his permanent replacement.

Theatre Credits

References

External links
Official website

Tom Hewitt at Internet Off-Broadway Database

American male musical theatre actors
American male stage actors
Living people
University of Wisconsin–Milwaukee alumni
People from Victor, Montana
Place of birth missing (living people)
Date of birth missing (living people)
1957 births